Aleksandar Stoyanov (born 25 July 1986) is a Bulgarian footballer who plays as a goalkeeper.

Career
Stoyanov began his football career with the CSKA Sofia youth team. At the age of 19, he signed his first professional contract with Etar 1924 Veliko Tarnovo. After spending two and a half years with Etar, Stoyanov transferred to Sportist Svoge in February 2009, conceding only five goals in 9 matches up to the end of the season. In the play-off for promotion in the top division against Naftex Burgas, he played a central role in the 6-4 penalty kick victory, saving the first attempt.

External links 
 Profile at football24.bg
 Guardian's Stats Centre

Bulgarian footballers
1986 births
Living people
First Professional Football League (Bulgaria) players
FC Etar 1924 Veliko Tarnovo players
FC Sportist Svoge players
FC Bansko players
FC Tsarsko Selo Sofia players

Association football goalkeepers